Prince Pedro of Bourbon-Two Sicilies, Duke of Calabria (born 16 October 1968), is the only son of Infante Carlos, Duke of Calabria (1938–2015), and his wife, Princess Anne of Orléans. He is a claimant to the headship of the House of Bourbon-Two Sicilies, which ruled the Kingdom of the Two Sicilies before the unification of Italy.

Claim

He is the only son of Infante Carlos, Duke of Calabria (1938–2015), and his wife, Princess Anne of Orléans. Pedro is currently one of two claimants to the headship of the House of Bourbon-Two Sicilies, since the death of his father on 5 October 2015. The other claimant is Prince Carlo, Duke of Castro. Pedro is claimant to the sovereignty of the Constantinian Order, grand master of the Order of Saint Januarius, president of the Council of the four Spanish Military Orders of Santiago, Calatrava, Alcántara and Montesa, and grand commander of the Order of Alcántara. He is also a grandee as the son of an infante of Spain.

Act of Cannes (1900)

On 14 December 1900, Prince Carlos, next oldest brother to the childless Prince Ferdinand, head of the House of Bourbon-Two Sicilies and irrefutable claimant to the extinct throne of the Two Sicilies, signed a private agreement of renunciation to the disappeared throne as he was marrying María de las Mercedes, Princess of Asturias, heir presumptive to the throne of Spain. This document, known as the Act of Cannes, was signed in purported obedience to the 1759 Pragmatic Sanction signed by Charles III of Spain where it was established that the thrones of Spain and Naples should never be held by the same monarch and thus divided them for the sake of a European balance of power. The newly independent Kingdom of Naples was ceded by Charles of Spain to his third child, who would become Ferdinand I of Naples. This would establish the kings of Naples and Sicily as cadet members of the Spanish royal family, and so the country enjoyed strong relationships with its 'mother state', following many of its legal customs. The Act of Cannes states:

Supporters of the other claimant to the headship of the House of Bourbon-Two Sicilies, sometimes referred to as the Castrist faction, argue that because Prince Carlos signed this agreement, he relinquished all of his rights and those of his descendants to both the headship of the family and the Sacred Military Constantinian Order of Saint George, and so the rights currently fall on Prince Carlo, Duke of Castro. However, supporters of Pedro, also known as the legitimists, argue that the Act of Cannes was drafted upon conditions that never arose, i.e. it would have only been valid if Prince Carlos would have indeed faced the situation of his wife inheriting the throne of Spain, something that never happened and was furthermore highly unlikely at the time the document was created. The legitimist supporters also point out several flaws in the document and its interpretation. Also, they argue that the Act of Cannes never mentioned the headship of the House of Bourbon-Two Sicilies or the grand magistry of the Constantinian Order, and so this was therefore never renounced. Regardless, it was founded as trustee Farnesian dynastic order, and so it is the mainstream academic view that succession is not linked to the throne of Naples and Sicily. Following this logic, at the very least, the headship and grand magistry of the Constantinian Order would fall on Prince Pedro.

Career

He has worked as a structural engineer. He manages the family estate, La Toledana in Ciudad Real, Spain, as well as other landed estates in Spain.

Marriage and issue

Pedro married Sofía Landaluce y Melgarejo (born 23 November 1973 in Madrid), daughter of José Manuel Landaluce y Domínguez and his wife María de las Nieves Blanca Melgarejo y González (granddaughter of the Dukes of San Fernando de Quiroga), on 30 March 2001 at Real Club de la Puerta de Hierro in Madrid. Pedro and Sofía have seven children:

 Prince Jaime of Bourbon-Two Sicilies (born 26 June 1992 in Madrid), Duke of Noto (Duke of Capua 2012–2015), Grand Constable of the Order of Saint George of the Reunion, Grand Prefect of the Constantinian Order, Knight of Alcántara, Knight of Honour and Devotion of the Sovereign Military Order of Malta. Married to Lady Charlotte Diana Lindesay-Bethune (born 12 May 1993), youngest child of Scottish businessman and politician James Lindesay-Bethune, 16th Earl of Lindsay and his wife, Diana Mary Chamberlayne-Macdonald, on 25 September 2021 at Monreale Cathedral.
 Prince Juan of Bourbon-Two Sicilies (born 18 April 2003 in Madrid)
 Prince Pablo of Bourbon-Two Sicilies (born 26 June 2004 in Madrid)
 Prince Pedro of Bourbon-Two Sicilies (born 3 January 2007 in Ciudad Real)
 Princess Sofía of Bourbon-Two Sicilies (born 12 November 2008 in Madrid)
 Princess Blanca of Bourbon-Two Sicilies (born 7 April 2011 in Ciudad Real)
 Princess María of Bourbon-Two Sicilies (born 5 March 2015 in Ciudad Real)

Honours 

Knight Grand Cross of Justice of the Sacred Military Constantinian Order of Saint George (1986–2015)
Grand Master of the Sacred Military Constantinian Order of Saint George since 5 November 2015
Grand Master of the Order of Saint Januarius since 5 November 2015
Bailiff Grand Cross of Honour and Devotion of the Sovereign Military Order of Malta
Grand Commander of the Order of Alcantara (2014)
President of the Royal Council of the Spanish Military Orders of Chivalry (Orders of Santiago, Calatrava Alcántara and Montesa) (appointed by HM King Juan Carlos I, 2014)
Knight Grand Cross of the Order of the Holy Sepulchre. 
 Commander of the Civil Order of Alfonso X the Wise (22 December 2017)
Caballero Protector de la Real Cuerpo de la Nobleza de Madrid

Other activities

 President of the Foundation for the Protection of Nature
 President of the Foundation Lux Hispaniarum
 President of the Foundation of the Hospital of Santiago de Cuenca
 Patron of the Foundation of Commanderies of Santiago
 Vice-President of the Delegation of the Community of Castilla-La Mancha of the APD

Arms

Ancestors

Notes

References

Bibliography
 
 
 

1968 births
Pedro
Nobility from Madrid
Dukes of Noto
Dukes of Calabria
Living people
Knights of the Order of Alcántara
Grandees of Spain
Knights of the Holy Sepulchre